The Dallas Texans were an Arena football team based in Dallas, Texas. The Texans were founded in 1990 and were a member of the Arena Football League (AFL). The team played for four seasons, and were relatively successful, making the playoffs three out of four seasons. They played their home games in the Reunion Arena, which they shared with the Dallas Mavericks of the National Basketball Association.

History

1990

In 1990, owner H. Lanier Richey brought the Arena Football League to the state of Texas for the first time. Richey named former Pittsburgh Steeler, Ernie Stautner as the Texans' first coach in franchise history. The Texans made a noise in May, when they traded 4 players to the Albany Firebirds, for former MVP Ben Bennett and former Ironman of the Year, Carl Aikens, Jr. Stautner lead the Texans to a 6–2 regular season record, and was named the AFL's Coach of the Year. The Texans made the ArenaBowl their first season of existence, falling to the Detroit Drive 51–27.

1991

In 1991, the Texans had to replace head coach Stautner (who had left for a job with the Denver Broncos), and did so by signing former Cowboys legend, Drew Pearson. Before the season began, the Texans traded Bennett to the Orlando Predators, after Bennett stated his displeasure with the Texans. The team replaced Bennett with former NFL running back, Alfred Jenkins. The Texans started off in the middle of the pack going 3–2 through the first 5 games, before finishing the season 1–4 in the final 5 games. Their 4–6 record was not enough to qualify for the playoffs.

1992

On February 21, 1992, Richey sold the franchise to Kent Kramer and Greg Gibson. Kramer replaced Pearson at head coach with Texas Tech assistant coach, John Paul Young. The Texans finished the season 5–5, winning the Western Division, but due to Kramer not anticipating a playoff home game, the Texans did not have the money in their budget to host a game and were forced to travel. The Texans traveled to Albany, New York to play the Firebirds, where they earned a 48–45 victory to advance to the 2nd round of the playoffs. The Texans would lose the following week to the eventual champion, the Detroit Drive.

1993

In 1993, Young left the Texans to take a job as the linebackers coach with the Denver Broncos. Kramer hired former Drive and Firebirds assistant, Jerry Trice to be the team's new head coach. The Texans finished the season a disappointing 3–9, but still qualified for the playoffs, losing in the first round. In October, the Texans were dropped from the AFL due to being unable to meeting financial requirements.

Future of AFL in Dallas
In 2000, Jerry Jones was awarded an expansion franchise in Dallas. Jones was considering using the nickname "Texans" but ultimately choose the Dallas Desperados, playing from 2002 to 2008. The most recent (but now also defunct) Dallas Vigilantes franchise was an expansion team unrelated to either the Texans or Desperados.

Season-by-season results

|-
|1990 || 6 || 2 || 0 || 2nd || Won Semifinals (Denver 26-25) Lost ArenaBowl IV (Detroit 51-27)
|-
|1991 || 4 || 6 || 0 || 6th || --
|-
|1992 || 5 || 5 || 0 || 1st Western || Won Week 1 (Albany 48-45) Lost Week 2 (Detroit 57-14)
|-
|1993 || 3 || 9 || 0 || 3rd AC || Lost Week 1 (Detroit 51-6)
|-
!Totals || 20 || 24 || 0
|colspan="2"| (including playoffs)
|}

Notable players

Final roster

Arena Football League Hall of Famers

All-Arena players
The following Texans players were named to All-Arena Teams:
QB Ben Bennett (1), Todd Hammel (1)
FB/LB Mitchell Ward (1)
WR/DB Carl Aikens, Jr. (1), Sam Moore (1), Gary Compton (1), Tyrone Thurman (1)
WR/LB Sam Moore (1)

Notable coaches

Head coaches
Note: Statistics are correct through the end of the 1990 Arena Football League season.

Notes
The team appeared on the game EA Sports Arena Football as a hidden bonus team, as well as the sequel Arena Football: Road to Glory.

References

External links
 Dallas Texans at ArenaFan.com

 
Defunct American football teams in Texas
1990 establishments in Texas